Demba may refer to:

Places
Demba, Democratic Republic of the Congo
Demba Kunda
Madina Demba Forest Park
Stade Demba Diop

People
Njogu Demba-Nyrén (born 1979), Gambian- Swedish professional football forward
Demba Touré (born 1984), Senegalese footballer
Demba Ba (born 1985), French-born Senegalese footballer
Demba Diop (1927–1967), former mayor of Mbour
Demba Savage  (born 1988), Gambian football forward
Abdoulaye Demba (born 1976), Malian footballer
Demba Barry (born 1987), Malian footballer
Demba Traore (born 1982), Swedish professional footballer